Bittersweet is the first EP from American folk rock project Aaron West and the Roaring Twenties, released on May 20, 2016, through Hopeless Records.

Background
The EP was announced on March 25, 2016, with one song, "'67, Cherry Red", being made available for streaming. The release of the EP features vinyl pressings on three different colors, Green, Blue, and Red, attributing to the songs "Green Like the G Train, Green Like Sea Foam", "Goodbye, Carolina Blues", and "'67, Cherry Red" respectively.

Track listing

Personnel
Credits from Discogs.

Aaron West and the Roaring Twenties
 Dan "Soupy" Campbell – Vocals, Guitar, Writing, Layout

Additional musicians
 Arthur "Ace" Enders – Guitar, bass, lap steel guitar, banjo
 Dave Heck – Trombone
 Mike Kelley – Saxophone, clarinet
 Michael Kennedy – Drums
 Juan Lopez – Trumpet

Artwork
 Allison Weiss – Artwork (logo)
 Mitchell Wojcik – Photography

Production
 Arthur "Ace" Enders – Producer, Mixing
 Bill Henderson – Mastering
 Ryan Pinkowicz – Engineer

References

2016 EPs
Hopeless Records EPs